Vertemate con Minoprio is a comune (municipality) in the Province of Como in the Italian region Lombardy, about  north of Milan and about  south of Como.

Main sights
Abbey of San Giovanni a Vertemate, consecrated in 1096. The Romanesque church, with a nave and two aisles, is home to traces of frescoes from the 14th and 15th centuries.
Castle
Villa Raimondi

Notable residents
Simone Tomassini, Italian singer-songwriter was born in Vertemate con Minoprio in 1974.

References

External links
 Official website

Cities and towns in Lombardy